Maria Zemskova-Korotkova (born 7 February 1953) is a Russian rowing coxswain. She won gold medals at World Rowing Championships in the women's coxed quad scull in 1981, 1982, and 1983.

References

Russian female rowers
World Rowing Championships medalists for the Soviet Union
1953 births
Living people